The Alien comic books are part of the Alien franchise and has had several titles published based on the license, most of which are part of the Dark Horse Comics line, but other comics by other distributors have been made. Marvel Comics obtained the license to the Aliens, Predator and Alien vs. Predator comics following the acquisition of 21st Century Fox by The Walt Disney Company.

Alien: The Illustrated Story
Alien: The Illustrated Story is a critically acclaimed graphic novel adaptation of the original 1979 movie Alien, published by Heavy Metal magazine the same year. The creative team consisted of Archie Goodwin as the scriptwriter and Walt Simonson as the artist. It won the Harvey Award for Best Graphic Album of Previously Published Work in 2013.

Dark Horse Comics 

Dark Horse Comics is the most well-known publisher of Aliens comics, having published many limited series from 1988 to 1999. Publishing took a hiatus until 2009.

Comics

Stories 
Stories based on the Alien franchise published in other comics, such as the Dark Horse Presents anthology title.

Marvel Comics

Other

Cancelled stories and titles

Collected editions

Dark Horse Comics

Marvel Comics

See also
 List of Alien (franchise) novels
 List of Predator (franchise) comics
 Aliens vs. Predator (comics)
 List of comics based on films

References

External links
Xenomorph (Aliens) at the Comic Book DB

1979 comics debuts
Alien (franchise) comics
Comics
Comics set on fictional planets
Lists of comics by title